Evan Carey (born ) is a Canadian male track cyclist. He competed in the team sprint event at the 2015 UCI Track Cycling World Championships.

References

External links
 Profile at cyclingarchives.com

1994 births
Living people
Canadian male cyclists
Canadian track cyclists
Cyclists at the 2015 Pan American Games
Pan American Games medalists in cycling
Pan American Games gold medalists for Canada
Sportspeople from Victoria, British Columbia
Medalists at the 2015 Pan American Games
20th-century Canadian people
21st-century Canadian people